Wally Buhaj (5 May 1947 – 14 November 2014) was an Australian rules footballer who played with Essendon in the Victorian Football League (VFL). He won Essendon's reserves best and fairest in 1968, the year they won the premiership. After leaving Essendon, Buhaj played with Burnie in Tasmania, before moving to Queensland and playing for Mayne, Wilston Grange and Strathpine.

Notes

External links 		
		

Essendon Football Club past player profile
		
		
		

2014 deaths
1947 births
Australian rules footballers from Victoria (Australia)		
Essendon Football Club players
Burnie Football Club players
Mayne Australian Football Club players
Wilston Grange Football Club players